The Great Lines Heritage Park is a complex network of open spaces in the Medway Towns, connecting Chatham, Gillingham, Brompton and the Historic Dockyard. The long military history of the towns has dominated the history of the site and the park. The Great Lines Heritage Park, consists of Fort Amherst, Chatham Lines, the Field of Fire (later known as the Great Lines), Inner Lines, Medway Park (sports centre) together with the Lower Lines.

The Lines, were constructed in Napoleonic times. They were never used (during the wars) but they have been used to be a barrier to development, keeping the fort and the Lines mostly untouched.

Most of the park is accessible to all at most times.
It has many pedestrian and cycle links for residents of the two towns of Gillingham and Chatham.

Chatham Lines
The Lines are known as a 'Bastion trace fortification', a linear defence with projecting bastions allowing covering fire to be directed into the ditches (on the landward side of the fort) flanking them. In England, they were relatively rare, and were principally adopted for dockyard and coastal defences. They stretch from Fort Amherst (overlooking Chatham Dockyard and River Medway), northwards across Brompton towards St Mary's creek near Gillingham.

Then during World War II, they were then massively re-fortified, with the Lines ditch acting as an anti-tank barrier, as part of the Medway war defences. Also air raid shelters, anti-aircraft gun emplacements, an emergency water reservoir, a pillbox and a spigot mortar, was added. At one stage, there were up to 31 anti-aircraft batteries in the Medway District (including 13 heavy and 20 light) and about 20 other temporary light batteries in 1944.

Later, after World War I and World War II, they fell into disuse. Parts around Brompton were then used for post-war housing.

The Chatham Lines are designated a Scheduled Ancient Monument (Kent no.ME201).

The Field of Fire
This is an open stretch of land immediately in front of the Chatham Lines fortifications (of Fort Amherst), if the outer fortification was breached then the enemy would have to cross the field of fire, its openness (meaning no shelter) would allow for a clear view, and shot, of the approaching enemy.

In 1709, by an Act of Parliament, the Government compulsorily purchased the land in 'Westcourt', along with a part of 'Upbury Manor' and some land in Chatham, for the building of the Dockyard defences and the lines.

A cricket pitch was also set-up on the land pre-1700s. But when the lines were extended and the Field of Fire was also extended, it also upset the locals of Gillingham. On 14 June 1758, Captain George Brisac (the Lines superintendent) was threatened with murder (by an unknown local) if he did not restore the pitch.

Between 1755 and 1756, the Chatham Lines were built as a large earthwork ditch around Fort Amherst.

This open land was used to graze cattle between 1760 and 1812.

In 1770, the parish surveyed the crown property around the lines. In 1781, it listed 16 public rights of way crossing the lines.

Between 1778–1783, the lines were extended and enhanced.

In 1800, Edward Hasted notes "Westward of the village (of Gillingham) is Upberry and the manor house of Westcourt; beyond which the ground ascends to the summit of the chalk hill, on which is the town of Brompton" 
 
In 1803, the Chatham Lines were upgraded (due to the start of the Napoleonic War). The ditch walls were rebuilt in brick.

In 1804, additional land was purchased by the government, to further extend the Field of Fire. This meant that West Court and Upbury Farmhouses were demolished.

From 1812, the Royal Engineers took over Brompton Barracks from the artillery.

The Field of Fire also provided the main exercise ground for the Engineers and their horses from 1824 until 1877. They were used to test defensive and offensive techniques and to test tactics in siege warfare, prior to foreign campaigns. The sieges also became major spectator events, including being recorded by Charles Dickens in The Pickwick Papers and in the Illustrated London Gazette.

Between 1822–1838, the Lines were also used to hold horse-racing events. They were very popular. They were held for two days in August in 1838.

In 1862, the Royal Engineers cricket team was established, using a pitch on the lines.

The Great Lines was also the home training pitch of the Royal Engineers (who were winners of the 1875 FA Cup Final).  In 1893, New Brompton Football Club was established. This later became Gillingham Football Club.

In 1872, plans for a railway line were drawn up by the Royal Commission to connect the forts.

In June 1897, the Great Lines (the name used for the Field of Fire) were used to host a celebration of the Diamond Jubilee of Queen Victoria. A huge bonfire was a grand finale of the day festivities. In 1902, on the coronation of King Edward VII, 8,000 children were assembled on the lines, to sing 'the Old Hundredth' and the 'National anthem'.  
 
In 1904, the 'Ravelin Building' was built (on the northside) of Brompton Road and Prince Arthur Road, in front of the Chatham Lines. It was used as Electrical engineer's school for the Royal Engineers. Designed by Major E.C.S.Moore (RE). In 1978, it was converted to a museum, 'The Royal Engineers Museum'. It was classed as Grade II listed on 5 December 1996.

Between 1914–18 (World War I), the Lines were used by the engineers to train in trench warfare and mining. The Lines were bombed several times, but the damage did not stop the dockyard working. The Field of Fire became a tented camp and parts of the Inner Lines gained accommodation huts, supplementing pre-existing barracks defending the Dockyard.

On 19 July 1919, Peace Day (which later become Armistice Day) was celebrated in Medway, which included a 'Big Tea Party' and evening fireworks display (organised by the military).

Also the 'Garrison Sports Ground' was built in the 1920s on the Great Lines, beside Brompton Road. Which was also the site of a large underground bomb shelter.

The Lines were also used for Home Guard training. In 1941, the fighting garrison in Medway totalled 5,270, combining Royal Navy, Royal Marines, army and Home Guard units. The Chatham Lines were also used as a Fire Service action station point.

In 1948, a NAAFI (Naval, Army and Air Force) club was built, beside Brompton Road on the Field of Fire, opposite the Garrison Sports Ground. Since the Field of Fire was no longer needed due to current wartime tactics. The club opened on 16 July 1948 by the Commander-in-Chief, The Nore, Admiral Sir Harold Burrough. It cost about £150,000 to build. It had 200 single, and 48 double rooms, a nursery and playroom, games room, restaurant, tavern bar, 3 flats and a large ballroom. On the opening night of the ballroom was Jack Train, Billy Ternent and his orchestra. One of the first visitors was King George VI. Due to the closure of many Royal Naval services in the Dockyard and Medway, the club became unprofitable, and on 28 July 1962 the club closed. After five years of being empty, it was bought by two Canadian Hotel owners, who converted it into a budget Hotel, then called 'The Aurora Hotel'. In 1980, it changed hands to new owners, who renamed it the King Charles Hotel. The land around the Hotel is not part of the Great Lines Heritage Park.

In 1957, part of the Great Lines (a plot of land close to Gillingham and Medway Hospital) was used to build  'The Great Lines School'. It opened in April 1957 and had 270 pupils. It was the first co-educational school in Gillingham. In June 1959, it became Upbury Manor school and was official re-opened by actress Dame Edith Evans. Since 2010, it is now known as Brompton Academy.

In 1989, the land was acquired by Gillingham Borough Council for the 'future amenity and enjoyment of local people'.

A part of the park has been designated a Site of Nature Conservation Interest (SNCI), for its chalk grassland flora and it has also been designated as a Local Wildlife Site (LWS). Notable species include the rare red star thistle (Centaurea calcitrapa), as well as wild clary (Salvia verbenaca) and squinancywort (Asperula cynanchica). Notable wildlife in the park, include the skylarks (Alauda), and kestrels, as well as many other birds, butterflies and insects.

Currently, the park is mainly used for informal leisure pursuits, such as kite-flying,  cycling and walking, as well as the annual fireworks display.

The park is also the venue for a free 5 km run each Saturday morning at 9am. Great Lines parkrun began in September 2013 and regularly attracts between 300 and 350 runners each week.

The park is also used for Armed Forces Day, and other large local events.

The Inner Lines
The name Inner Lines was originally applied to all the open area immediately behind the defensive ramparts of the Great Lines. This area was intended for the mustering and manoeuvring of troops for the defence of the fortifications, and were initially kept free of buildings.

In June 1808, after an act of parliament was passed, the main road from Gillingham to Chatham (via the Field of Fire) was closed. The other remaining linking road, went through the lines via a new drawbridge at the northern Sally Port. This became locally known as the 'Brompton Barrier'. Footpaths passing through the southern Sally Port remained in use.

In 1863, the Garrison Gymnasium was built (inside the Lines and beside the remaining road). It is now Grade II* listed.

In December 1868, by permission of the War Secretary, a portion of the inner line of fortifications, adjoining Fort Amherst, (between the Field of Fire and the Dockyard) was set apart as a recreation ground for the use of the officers connected with the (Chatham Dockyard) garrison. An avenue of trees was part of this new Victorian park, which also included carriage drives and tennis courts.

In 1876, a plan shows that the Brompton Barrier is still in place, but the guard house is disused. In 1879, an Ordnance Survey map is made of the area, it shows that the barrier has been removed and the road has been straightened and used a causeway to pass over the ditch (instead of a drawbridge). This was due to the building of the Commandant's House (started in 1876), which also meant a large garden, hence the road re-alignment. The Sally Port remained intact. But by the 1909 OS Map survey, the Sallyport was demolished, but the Guardhouse remained.

During the 18th Century the Inner Lines played home to the true park and recreation ground of the Military Residents. It contained the 'Commandant’s Pleasure Grounds and Kitchen Garden'. The formal layout of the gardens reflected the need for military order, somewhat at odds with the fashion at the time of creating Capability Brown style landscapes.

On the 1909 O.S. map, it shows the name of the road from Gillingham to Chatham passing through Brompton and the Lines, named as 'Brompton Road'.

Between 1914-18 (World War I), parts of the Inner Lines were used to site accommodation huts, supplementing pre-existing barracks defending the Dockyard.

During 1945, anti-tank defences were erected along the lines, this meant some of the ditch around Chatham Lines were filled in.

After the war, during the 60s, more of the Chatham Lines were either removed and more of the ditch was filled. Also within the Inner Lines, post-war housing was erected for the troops of the Royal Engineers. The houses in Brompton were also used for engineers working on the Chatham Dockyard nuclear submarine refit facilities.

As part of the Great Lines Heritage Park (set up in 2008), the Inner Lines is mostly woodland, sports pitches and gardens, which are undergoing various stages of restorations.

Medway Park

Formerly the Black Lion Sports Centre. Now called 'Medway Park' and the sports areas around it, would have been farmland during the 18th century forming part of the medieval manor of 'Westcourt Farm'. The site of where the manor house was located is now used by the United Services rugby pitches (opposite the King Charles Hotel on Brompton Road).

In 1709, by an Act of Parliament, the Government compulsorily purchased the land in 'Westcourt', along with a part of Upberry Manor and some land in Chatham, for the building of the Dockyard defences and the lines.
Edward Hasted notes "Westward of the village (of Gillingham) is Upberry and the manor house of Westcourt; beyond which the ground ascends to the summit of the chalk hill, on which is the town of Brompton"

The public house was originally a farmhouse (at the junction of Gillingham Lane and Spray Lane). The first record of the inn is in 1766. The licensee was John Huggins, then in 1768 Daniel Coombes took over ownership of the pub. Then in 1769, the government decided to extend the 'field of fire' of the Chatham Lines.
They bought land beside the Lines, converting it into farmland, which they leased out for the next 20 years. The inn's lease expired so the owner acquired a new plot of land outside of the field of fire land (about 16 foot). The timber-structure was then re-built along Mill Road (which was then known as Fox Lane). It later was called the Black Lion Hotel. In 1896, it was re-built of brick. In the 1920s, the name was changed to the Black Lion, after the licensee (Mr Cockrill) appealed to the brewers. The farm fields around the pub, were known as the 'Black Lion Fields'. In the 1970s, the sports centre was built on the fields and named after the fields.

In December 2007, worked started on a 3-year refurbishment on the leisure centre, costing £11.1million. A new purpose-built gymnastics centre and an eight-lane athletics track was built. 
This 'regional centre of sporting excellence', was completed in 2010.

It was then opened on 28 July 2011 by Princess Anne. Following the opening the park hosted the 2011 European Modern Pentathlon Championships.

During, the 2012 London Olympics, it was used as a training centre for 2012 Olympics overseas’ teams including the Senegal Team. The Paralympic Association of Barbados and Portuguese trampolining squad have also signed agreements to train for the Olympics at Medway Park and the neighbouring Jumpers Rebound Centre respectively.

The Black Lion public house, closed as a pub in March 2013.

In June 2014, 'Medway and Maidstone Athletic Club' held the first local competition on the athletics track.

The Lower Lines

Built in 1804, as an extension of the 'Chatham Lines' (built in 1755). They are large deep ditches with brick lined walls (similar to the upgraded Fort Amherst fortifications).

It is designated as a Scheduled Ancient Monument.

In June 1808, after an act of parliament was passed, a road from Gillingham heading north towards St Mary's Island was closed, for the building of the Lower Lines.

Afterwards in the 1800s, the Lower Lines were used to train the Royal Engineer sappers, including mining, removing defence foundations and escalading.

In the 1930s, several tunnels and underground shelters were built into the land. Some accounts record they were built by Cornish tin miners. The tunnels and rooms are 80–100 feet below ground, they then became the Headquarters of the Commander-in-Chief, The Nore,  during the Second World War.
The headquarters were enhanced by the 'Francois Cementation Co Ltd', the same company that later built the Ramsgate Tunnel war shelters.

The lines fortifications were also used to site several anti-aircraft guns positions. Some of the remains of these positions still remain in the park with new visitor information panels.

Along Medway Road, surviving concrete pimple anti-tank obstacles can be found in the Inner Lines. They are now Grade II listed.

In 1963, Captain J. S. M. Richardson DSO RN (Rtd) was invited to set up a Royal Naval Reserve Headquarters Unit in Chatham. It used the underground bunker. As a Commander RNR, he had served as the first Commanding Officer of  - a name long associated with Sheerness Naval Base. The Unit was commissioned on 10 September 1964 with 13 Officers and 39 Ratings. They had to improve the structure which had not been looked after very well since the wartime period. The Unit used the communications/ exchange area which was improved along with the plotting area. Other ancillary rooms were converted into offices and classrooms. The Unit's primary function was a training facility.

The tunnels and Headquarters remained in use until 1983, with the closure of Chatham Naval Base and HMS Wildfire moved to

Later, the tunnels were damaged when a fire broke out soon after their closure. Access to them has proved difficult due to the poor air quality within the complex. Due to the creation of the park they were sealed to protect the tunnels from further damage.

In December 2008, the government announced a further £2m of investment from its "Parklands" fund, to be invested in pathways, lighting, entrances and a pedestrian bridge connecting the Great Lines to Fort Amherst. Then MidKent College, who built a new campus on part of the Lower Lines, gave £7million to the Heritage Park to improve the Lower Lines.
The Lower Lines Park is 5.5 hectares of the open land linked to the Lines fortifications. It has been re-developed with new signs, paths, planting areas, children play area and wildlife trail.
 
In January 2010 the park was opened to the public. On 2 June 2010, it was officially opened to the public by Admiral Sir Ian Garnett with the Mayor of Medway, Cllr David Brake, project director for the construction of MidKent College's Medway Campus and the Lower Lines Park, Jane Jones, and Chairman of the Park's Charitable Trust, John Spence. The ceremony was also attended by local sea cadets who performed a guard of honour.

The Lower Lines Trust are the managers of the Park maintenance and development. The 'Friends of the Admiral’s Garden' is a voluntary group who look after the Lower Lines Park. Lower Lines Park is accessible at all times.

Heritage Park
In 2008, funding of £2 million was awarded by the Government’s Parklands Thames Gateway Fund (via Margaret Beckett, Minister for the Thames Gateway) to develop the area into a Park. A further £74,000 from EU funding (via HMS2 'Heritage and maritime memories in the 2 seas region' project), for lighting of the Chatham Naval Memorial on the Field of Fire, Fort Amherst and signage across the Park was also received.

The park team carried out a large residents and land owners consultation exercise, to find priorities and to unite the area as The Great Lines Heritage Park. The feedback exercise was ended in March 2011. With the main priorities of the park being 'Make the park accessible and feel safe' and Restore the Fort (Amherst) and to create an attractive space with strong pedestrian links promoting sustainable movement of people across Medway. The Park, alongside Chatham Historic Dockyard and Upnor Castle was to play a major part in Chatham’s bid for World Heritage Status.

But in 2014, the World heritage Status was not going to be put forward for nomination by the UK Government. It lost out to the Lake District national park in Cumbria, to be decided in 2017.

Awards
The park was a winner Local Landscape Planning and Highly commended, at the Landscape Institute Awards 2011 in the Heritage and Conservation category.

In August 2013, the Park received its first Green Flag Award.

References

External links
Friends of the Admiral’s Garden, volunteers of the Lower Lines Park 

Urban public parks
Gillingham, Kent